Moonshine and Valentine (Chinese: 结爱·千岁大人的初恋), also known as The Love Knot: His Excellency's First Love, is a 2018 Chinese streaming television series based on the novel Jie Ai·Yihe Fenghuan (Chinese: 结爱·异客逢欢) by Shi Dingrou. The series was directed by Leste Chen, and stars Victoria Song and Huang Jingyu. It aired on Tencent Video from May 9, 2018 and ended on June 13, 2018.

Synopsis
Guan Pipi (Victoria Song)'s life was normal and peaceful until she meets a man called Helan Jingting (Huang Jingyu). Helan is an alien "fox" who has lived for a millennium, while Pipi is a seemingly normal human. It is revealed through flashbacks that in Pipi's first lifetime, she (named Hui Yan then) was a sacrifice to cure Helan's health issues. As a result, she never lives beyond 25 years old. Unexpectedly, they fell in love, and now Helan searches for Pipi in each of her  lifetime. In modern day, Helan searches for a cure for Pipi's curse.

Cast

Main
Victoria Song as Guan Pipi / Hui Yan
An intern at a newspaper publishing company. She is the reincarnation of Hui Yan, Helan Jingting's beloved wife. 
Huang Jingyu as Helan Jingting
Right priest of the Fox clan. He is the son of Princess Xiyan and a human. As a result, he was born with an eye condition that rendered him unable to see until he drinks a liquid containing the liver of Hui Yan.   He disguises himself as an antiques collector.

Supporting

Fox clan
Li Jiaming as Kuan Yong
Helan Jingting's sidekick. He is calm and composed, and is considerate toward others.
Li Shen as Xiu Xian 
Helan Jingting's sidekick. He is bubbly and talkative. 
Jiang Qilin as Zhao Song 
Left priest of the Fox Clan. He has a one-sided love for Qian Hua. He is at odds with Helan Jingting, whom he considers as his rival. 
Zhang Baijia as Tushan Qian Hua 
A distinguished lady of the Tushan family. She has a one-sided love for Helan Jingting, and would do anything for him.
Su Ke as Qing Mu
Ruler of the Fox clan. Helan Jingting's father.
Wang Xin as Bo Zhong 
Princess Zhaoyan's subordinate. 
Yang Kaidi as Su Mei 
A woman who ends up befriending Guan Pipi and gives her advice. 
Wang Jianing as Fang Jinxue 
A mysterious celebrity who used to have a crush on Kuan Yong.
Yang Zishan as Princess Xiyan
Helan Jingting's birth mother. 
Li Yijuan as Princess Zhaoyan

People around Guan Pipi
Liu Yongxi as Xiao Ju 
Guan Pipi's close friend. She becomes involved in a love triangle between Kuan Yong and Xiu Xian. 
Xu Kaicheng as Tao Jialin 
Guan Pipi's first love. He later betrays her by becoming romantically involved with Tian Xin behind Pipi's back. 
Xu Fangyi as Tian Xin
Guan Pipi's close friend. She later betrays her by becoming romantically involved with Tao Jialin behind Pipi's back.
Ma Xiaoyuan as Wang Xuan
A nosy reporter who becomes involved in the affairs of the Fox clan.

Production
The series was filmed at Bangkok, Thailand from September to December 2017.

Reception
Moonshine and Valentine received positive reviews for its high quality production, tight plot and fresh characterizations. Both leads, Song and Huang, were praised for their performance and use of original voices. The series also garnered more than 2 billion views in Tencent before the series ended.

However, the later episodes received criticism for its abrupt change in plot direction and decreased screentime of the leads. In response to this, the scriptwriter published a written apology on Weibo, asking the viewers not to blame the director and the actors for the collapse in narrative.

Soundtrack

Awards and nominations

References

Chinese romantic fantasy television series
Television shows based on Chinese novels
2018 Chinese television series debuts
2018 Chinese television series endings
2018 web series debuts
Chinese web series
Tencent original programming
Television series by Tencent Penguin Pictures
Television series by Mango Studios